Michael Murphy (born 15 April 1939) is an English former amateur footballer who played in the Football League Third Division South as a goalkeeper for Reading.

He also played for several amateur clubs, including Thornycroft Athletic in the Hampshire League, Redhill in the Athenian League and, while doing his National Service, Wembley in the Corinthian League. His two first team appearances for Reading were in a league match against Brentford (lost 2–1) and a London Charity Cup fixture against Queens Park Rangers (drew 1–1).

References
General
. Retrieved 20 October 2013.
Specific

1939 births
Living people
Sportspeople from Reading, Berkshire
English footballers
Association football goalkeepers
Thornycroft Athletic F.C. players
Reading F.C. players
Redhill F.C. players
Wembley F.C. players
English Football League players
Footballers from Berkshire